The Office of Women's Issues, formerly the Ministry of the Status of Women (between 2017 and 2018) and Ontario Women's Directorate (prior to 2017), is an office within the Ministry of Children, Community and Social Services in the province of Ontario, responsible for women's issues including violence against women and economic inequality.

It is overseen by the Minister Responsible for Women's Issues, a member of the Executive Council of Ontario (provincial cabinet). The current minister is Jane McKenna, appointed in June 2021.

History 

The Women's Bureau was created in 1963 in the Department of Labour to foster fuller utilization of the female labour force. In December 1970, the Bureau was given responsibility for administering the Women's Equal Employment Opportunities Act. However, in June 1972, this Act was repealed, and its provisions were incorporated into the Ontario Human Rights Code. As a result, the Women's Bureau was transferred to the Ontario Human Rights Commission in 1972. Late in 1973, a Women's Program Division was created within the Ministry of Labour, and the Women's Bureau was transferred back to the labour ministry. In 1978, the Women's Program Division was disbanded, and the Bureau reported directly to the Deputy Minister of Labour.

The Ontario Women's Directorate was established by Premier Bill Davis in 1983, with the appointment of Deputy Premier Bob Welch as the inaugural Minister Responsible for Women's Issues. Glenna Carr was appointed as the first executive director of the Directorate. The Women's Bureau was transferred to the Directorate, and was eventually fully absorbed by the Directorate.

In January 2017, the Directorate was elevated by Ontario's first female Premier Kathleen Wynne to a new stand-alone ministry called the Ministry of the Status of Women, with a dedicated full minister titled Minister of the Status of Women. However, this elevated status was short-lived. In June 2018, Premier Doug Ford downgraded the ministry back to non-portfolio responsibilities, overseen by the Minister Responsible for Women's Issues.

List of ministers
Key:

External links
 

Status of Women
Women's ministries
Ministries established in 2017
2017 establishments in Ontario
Women in Ontario